The 1957 Oregon State Beavers football team represented Oregon State College in the 1957 NCAA University Division football season. Led by third-year head coach Tommy Prothro, the Beavers went 8–2, and outscored their opponents 203 to 129.  Oregon State won their second consecutive Pacific Coast Conference championship, the only time the Beavers have won consecutive conference championships. The team captain was Ted Searle.

Oregon State became the second and last PCC team to be adversely affected by the "no-repeat" rule for the Rose Bowl. Unranked rival Oregon, which had lost to the Beavers, went instead. Three years earlier, undefeated UCLA had to stay home, too. Implemented after California lost a third straight Rose Bowl in January 1951, the rule was thrown out for West Coast teams when the PCC disbanded in 1959, but the Big Ten retained theirs from the late 1940s until the early 1970s.

Schedule

Sources:

NFL draft

References

Oregon State
Oregon State Beavers football seasons
Pac-12 Conference football champion seasons
Oregon State Beavers football